The 2008 European Figure Skating Championships was a senior international figure skating competition in the 2007–08 season. Medals were awarded in the disciplines of men's singles, ladies' singles, pair skating, and ice dancing. The event was held from January 21 through 27, 2008 at Dom Sportova in Zagreb, Croatia.

Qualifying
The competition was open to skaters from European ISU member nations who had reached the age of 15 before July 1, 2007. The corresponding competition for non-European skaters was the 2008 Four Continents Championships. Based on the results of the 2007 European Championships, each country was allowed between one and three entries per discipline. National associations selected their entries based on their own criteria.

Schedule
Times are CET.

 Tuesday, January 22
 14:00 Ice dancing – Compulsory dance
 18:30 Opening ceremony
 19:15 Pairs – Short program
 Wednesday, January 23
 12:15 Men – Short program
 18:30 Pairs – Free skating
 Thursday, January 24
 13:30 Ice dancing – Original dance
 18:30 Men – Free skating
 Friday, January 25
 12:15 Ladies – Short program
 18:30 Ice dancing – Free dance
 Saturday, January 26
 13:00 Ladies – Free skating
 Sunday January 27
 15:00 Exhibition gala

Medals table

Results

Men

Ladies

Pairs

Ice dancing

References

  
 
 Competitors list

External links

 Official site
 
 http://www.isuresults.com/results/ec2008/
 ISU Full Story Dance CD and Pairs SP

European Figure Skating Championships
European
European Figure Skating Championships, 2008
European 2008
Sports competitions in Zagreb
January 2008 sports events in Europe
2000s in Zagreb